The French frigate Némésis was an Artémise class screw-powered 50-gun second rate frigate of the French Navy in the 19th century. She was launched in 1847 at Brest, and participated in campaigns in Asia.

In 1857–1858, she was the flagship of Admiral Charles Rigault de Genouilly during the Second Opium War, and in Vietnam at the Siege of Đà Nẵng. In 1857, she ran aground in the Bangka Strait.

She was used for harbour service at Lorient in 1866, and was scrapped in 1889.

Notes

See also
List of French sail frigates

Frigates of the French Navy
1847 ships
Ships built in France
Maritime incidents in 1857